DVS '33 Ermelo (English: Strong Through Unity) is a Dutch amateur  football club from Ermelo, founded 1 September 1933. The club currently competes in the Derde Divisie, the fourth tier of league football in the Netherlands.

The club evolved out of the merger of two football clubs from Ermelo, namely Ajax Ermelo and EFC. It is the largest and most successful club from Ermelo. Some of the club's youth teams compete at the national level, for example against youth teams of Ajax and Vitesse Arnhem. In 2007 DVS '33 was one of three clubs to be nominated for the Amateur football club of the year.

In 2015 DVS '33 were promoted to the Topklasse, the third tier of league football in the Netherlands. On 22 August 2015 they played their first match in Topklasse, a 3–3 draw against Excelsior Maassluis.

Current squad
As of 23 March 2020

References

External links 
 
 Official business club

DVS '33
Football clubs in the Netherlands
Association football clubs established in 1933
1933 establishments in the Netherlands
Football clubs in Gelderland
Ermelo, Netherlands